Charles Lungen (13 April 1908 – 20 October 1972) was a Dutch footballer. He played in one match for the Netherlands national football team in 1937.

References

External links
 

1908 births
1972 deaths
Dutch footballers
Netherlands international footballers
Place of birth missing
Association footballers not categorized by position